Fustius is a genus of moths of the family Erebidae erected by Michael Fibiger in 2011.

Species
Fustius sterlingi Fibiger, 2010
Fustius malaysiensis Fibiger, 2010
Fustius parasensora Fibiger, 2010
Fustius sensora Fibiger, 2010
Fustius biextuta Fibiger, 2010
Fustius extuta Fibiger, 2010
Fustius gregerseni Fibiger, 2010
Fustius s-forma Fibiger, 2010
Fustius papei Fibiger, 2010

References

Micronoctuini
Noctuoidea genera